The thoracoacromial artery (acromiothoracic artery; thoracic axis) is a short trunk that arises from the second part of the axillary artery, its origin being generally overlapped by the upper edge of the pectoralis minor.

Structure
Projecting forward to the upper border of the Pectoralis minor, it pierces the coracoclavicular fascia and divides into four branches—pectoral, acromial, clavicular, and deltoid.

Additional images

References

External links
 
 
  - "Pectoral Region: Thoracoacromial Artery and its Branches"
  - "The axillary artery and its major branches shown in relation to major landmarks."

Arteries of the upper limb